Natalia Sergeevna Bardo (born 5 April 1988) is a Russian actress, singer and a TV host.

Biography 
Natalia Bardo was born in Moscow, Russian SFSR, Soviet Union. She used to live with her mother, who was an entrepreneur. Her father is a former athlete.

She attended art school, basketball, ballet and gymnastics as a child. At the age of 18 she was given her first role in "Pushkin. The Last Duel"  feature film. She graduated from the Banking Institute college; entered and successfully completed her studies at the school of modelling and acting. She entered the Banking Institute afterwards.

In 2006 Natalia played a daughter of Evelena Bleodans’s character - Alina (“Cursed Heaven” - “Proklyaty Rai” series), which was released in January, 2007.

In 2007 Natalia was invited to play in “Cursed Heaven 2”.

In June 2010 she changed her surname for “Bardo". She studied in The Boris Shchukin Theatre Institute.

Personal life 
 Former husband (from January 2009 to 2012) - Sergey Rusakov, businessman.
 In 2016, it became known about Natalia's relationship with the director Maryus Vaysberg. In 2018, the couple announced their wedding.
 Son - Eric (born May 31, 2016).

Television 
Natalia playing her role in “Made of Gold. Barvikha 2” - “Zolotyye. Barvikha 2”, which was first released on “TNT” TV channel.

Her first lead role in a melodrama series was in "Veronica - Lost happiness” ("Russia " TV channel) in 2012, and a year later continued to work on the next season - "Veronica. The Fugitive” (Beglyanka)

From January to July 2007 she took part in a TV project called "Dom-2".

One of her main projects is a comedy series called "Anzhelika" on the STS TV channel.

In 2015 she hosted a TV show called "Mr. and Mrs. Media" on the “First” TV channel with Marat Basharov.

Natalia took part in a traditional fashion-calendar presentation of the Charity Fund "Russian Silhouette".

Discography 
In autumn 2010 Natalia recorded the official cover version of the “Alejandro” hit by Lady Gaga in Russian -  Gaga’s producers chose Natalia’s text from a dozen of translations.

In 2010 Natalia Bardo also recorded her single "Oblom" - “Failure”, and a year later - "I want to scream", "Bardo", "Day and night", "Dreams of you", "Rain drops", "6 Letters", and on April 7, 2011 presented her solo project in a dance-pop format. Songs from Natalya's future album and her cover version of "Alejandro" were first presented in this show.

Singles 

 2010
 Alejandro
 Oblom (Failure)
 2011
 I want to scream 
 Bardo 
 Day and Night
 Dreams of you
 Rain Drops 
 Six letters

Filmography

Music video appearances 

 «Propaganda» («Yolki-Palki»). 
 Maria Kozhevnikova and Vitaly Gogunsky(«Who, if not us?») 
 Vlad Sokolovsky («Target», director —Alexey Golubev).

Awards 

 Miss Charm of Russia 2009
 Miss AutoLadyShow
 International Prize "Women's Pride" winner.
 "Woman of the World" holder

References

External links 
 Natalya Bardo on IMDb
  official site Natalia Bardo
 

1988 births
Living people
Russian film actresses
Russian television actresses
Russian stage actresses
21st-century Russian actresses
21st-century Russian women singers
21st-century Russian singers
Russian television presenters
Pseudonymous artists
Actresses from Moscow
Russian women television presenters